Kuwani is a poorly attested Papuan language of the Bird's Head Peninsula of New Guinea. It is attested only from a single word list, and even its exact location is unknown.

Comparison
Smits and Voorhoeve (1998) assumed it to be equivalent to Kalabra, but there are significant lexical differences. Some lexical differences between Kuwani and Kalabra are given below.

{| class="wikitable"
! gloss !! Kuwani !! Kalabra
|-
| ‘ear’ || indibit || difitlas
|-
| ‘eye’ || inzibun || sifogo
|-
| ‘hand’ || owani || defo
|-
| ‘1’ || tetike || tet
|}

References

Languages of western New Guinea

West Bird's Head languages